Andri Sebastian Silberschmidt (born February 26, 1994) is a Swiss businessman, politician and former banker. He currently serves as a member of the National Council (Switzerland) for The Liberals since 2019.

Early life and education 
Silberschmidt was born February 26, 1994, in Zürich, Switzerland to Georg und Katharina Silberschmidt (née Wimmer). He grew-up in the Zurich Highlands and attended local public schools. He grew up in a regular middle-class family. His father was a gymnastics teacher at the Gossau public schools. His mother is an interior designer. His paternal family was partially of Jewish descent from Germany, his ancestor Moise Silberschmidt, immigrated to La Chaux-de-Fonds around 1870 and ultimately became a citizen there (place of origin) in 1875. The second generation were active in several industries, such as investments in the textile industry, and became citizens of Zürich in 1938. On his maternal side he is of Hungarian descent. While not entirely clear, it's believed that he is non-practicing or one of his ancestors has converted to another religion.

He attended public schools and dropped out of high school in grade 9. Silberschmidt ultimately completed a commercial apprenticeship in banking including professional maturity at Zurich Cantonal Bank between 2009 and 2012. Between 2013 and 2017, Silberschmidt completed a Bachelor of Science in Business Administration majoring in Banking and Finance at the Zurich University of Applied Science (ZHAW) with an exchange at Cass Business School in London. He completed a Master of Science in Global Finance from Bayes Business School (then Cass Business School).

Professional career 
Since 2012, Silberschmidt worked as an equity fund manager at Swisscanto, a subsidiary of Zurich Cantonal Bank, offering financial services and fund services. He specifically managed quantitative funds for the third world. Since 2020, he works as the corporate secretary for logistics and transportation company Planzer, he formerly worked there as a project manager of the CFO office, and assistant to the executive board and board of directors.

He currently also serves as a strategic advisor for the Marcuard Family Office and president of FH Switzerland. He is currently a board member of Jucker Farm AG as well as Kaisin AG, a poké bole operation with several locations in Swiss cities, which he co-founded in 2017. He is a member of the board of trustees of Stiftung Wohnungen für kinderreiche Familien (en. Foundation Apartments for large families) and the Fritz-Gerber-Stiftung für begabte junge Menschen (en. Fritz-Gerber-Foundation for gifted young people).

Politics 
In 2011, Silberschmidt joined the Young Liberals (Switzerland), aged 17. Shortly after joining, he founded the Young Liberals of the Hin

wil District group, of which he became the chairman. In 2013, he took over the presidency of the Young Liberals of the Canton of Zurich. From March 2016 to November 2019, Silberschmidt presided over the Young Liberals of Switzerland, with whom he launched the so-called Pension Initiative. His successor in this position was Matthias Müller.

Between 2018 and 2020, Silberschmidt was elected to serve in the Zurich municipal council, were he represented districts 7 and 8. In the 2019 Swiss federal election, Silberschmidt was elected to the National Council (Switzerland) for The Liberals, defeating incumbent Hans-Ulrich Bigler. He was 25 years old which makes him the youngest elected member of the National Council in the 51st legislative period. At The Liberals delegates' meeting on October 2, 2021, he was elected to the vice presidency of The Liberals Switzerland together with Johanna Gapany.

From January to February 2019, he was a participant in the highly selective International Visitor Leadership Program (IVLP) of the United States Department of State, which took place in Washington, D.C., Baltimore, San Francisco, Oklahoma City and Orlando.

Personal life 
Silberschmidt is in a relationship with venture capitalist and start-up investor Andrea Buhofer (b. 1994). They reside in Enge (Zürich).

He is a dual-citizen of Switzerland and Germany.

References 

1994 births
Living people
Politicians from Zürich
Businesspeople from Zürich